Holidays in the Danger Zone: Meet the Stans is a four-part travel documentary on Central Asia, part of the Holidays in the Danger Zone series, produced and broadcast by BBC Correspondent (now This World). Written and presented by Simon Reeve, It was first broadcast from 3–6 November 2003, on BBC Two, and internationally during 2004 and 2005.

Episode 1: Kazakhstan
Episode 2: Kyrgyzstan
Episode 3: Uzbekistan
Episode 4: Tajikistan

In the series Reeve visits four of the five former soviet Central Asia republics (not Turkmenistan).  Travelling from the far north-west of Kazakhstan by the Russian border, he visits a former Soviet weapons lab, goes east to the Chinese border, south through Kyrgyzstan and Tajikistan to the edge of Afghanistan, and west to Uzbekistan and the legendary Silk Road cities of Samarkand and Bukhara.

See also
 Holidays in the Danger Zone
 Holidays in the Axis of Evil 
 America Was Here
 The Violent Coast 
 Rivers 
 Places That Don't Exist

References

External links 
www.shootandscribble.com
 http://www.cbc.ca/correspondent/feature_04-12-20.html
 http://news.bbc.co.uk/2/hi/asia-pacific/3143462.stm

BBC television documentaries
BBC World News shows